The 1991 Missouri Tigers football team represented the University of Missouri in the 1991 NCAA Division I-A football season.  The 1991 season was the third year of coach Bob Stull at Missouri. It opened with a 23–19 victory over Illinois in Columbia. The Tigers could only win one conference game, losing their final game in Lawrence to Kansas, 53–29, the 100th meeting of the team in the annual Border War.

Schedule

Roster

References

Missouri
Missouri Tigers football seasons
Missouri Tigers football